The granite spiny lizard (Sceloporus orcutti) is a species of lizard in the family Phrynosomatidae.

Etymology
The epithet, orcutti, honors American naturalist Charles Russell Orcutt (1864–1929), who collected the type specimen in San Diego County, California.

Geographic range
S. orcutti is native to southern California in the United States and Baja California in Mexico.

Description
The granite spiny lizard is  snout-to-vent length (SVL). Its dorsal scales are strongly keeled and pointed on its body and tail. It has a wide purple mid-dorsal stripe. The males of the species have yellow-green and blue-centered scales on the body; juveniles and females have distinct yellow-tan transverse bands on their body and tail. Additionally, the male has deep-blue ventral patches on its chest and throat and femoral pores.

Behavior and habitat
The granite spiny lizard is a colorful species that can be observed perched atop boulders from considerable distance. This species is primarily associated with rocky hillsides and outcrops.

Reproduction
S. orcutti is oviparous.

Sources
This article is based on a description from "A Field Guide to the Reptiles and Amphibians of Coastal Southern California", Robert N. Fisher and Ted J. Case, USGS, http://www.werc.usgs.gov/fieldguide/index.htm.

References

Further reading
Behler JL, King FW (1979). The Audubon Society Field Guide to North American Reptiles and Amphibians. New York: Alfred A. Knopf. 743 pp. 657 color plates. . (Sceloporus orcutti, p. 527 + Plate 351).
Stebbins RC (2003). A Field Guide to Western Reptiles and Amphibians, Third Edition. The Peterson Field Guide Series ®. Boston and New York: Houghton Mifflin  Company. xiii + 533 pp., 56 color plates. . (Sceloporus orcutti, pp. 287-288 + Plate 31 + Map 89).
Stejneger L (1893). "Annotated List of the Reptiles and Batrachians Collected by the Death Valley Expedition in 1891, with Descriptions of New Species". North American Fauna (7): 159-228. (Sceloporus orcutti, new species, p. 181 + Plate I, Figures 4a-4c).

Sceloporus
Reptiles of the United States
Reptiles of Mexico
Reptiles described in 1893
Taxa named by Leonhard Stejneger